Prologue of F.T. Island: Soyogi is the first Japanese EP released by South Korean rock band F.T. Island on 7 June 2008. Two of the songs, Primadonna and F.T. Island are Japanese-language versions of previously released Korean songs, while Always Be Mine is the English-language version of First Kiss. Music videos were released to Soyogi and Friendship. An extended version was later released as their first Japanese studio album, Japan Special Album Vol. 1.

Track listing

References

F.T. Island EPs
2008 EPs
Japanese-language EPs
Rock EPs